The 2014 United States Senate election in South Carolina took place on November 4, 2014, concurrently with a special election for South Carolina's other Senate seat, as well as other elections to the United States Senate in other states and elections to the United States House of Representatives and various state and local elections.

Incumbent Republican Lindsey Graham won reelection to a third term. He faced Democratic state senator Brad Hutto and Independent Thomas Ravenel in the general election. He defeated both of them by a 15-point margin.

As of 2022, this is the last time that Barnwell County, Darlington County, and Calhoun County voted Democratic in a Senate election.

Republican primary 
Of all the Republican senators up for re-election in the 2014 cycle, Graham was considered one of the most vulnerable to a primary challenge, largely due to his low approval ratings and reputation for working with and compromising with Democrats. He expected a primary challenge from conservative activists, including the Tea Party movement, and Chris Chocola, president of the Club for Growth, indicated that his organization would support a primary challenge if an acceptable standard-bearer emerged.

However, a serious challenger to Graham failed to emerge and he was widely viewed as likely to win, which has been ascribed to his "deft maneuvering" and "aggressive" response to the challenge. He befriended potential opponents from the state's congressional delegation and helped them with fundraising and securing their preferred committee assignments; he assembled a "daunting multimillion-dollar political operation" dubbed the "Graham machine" that built six regional offices across the state and enlisted the support of thousands of paid staffers and volunteers, including over 5,000 precinct captains; he assembled a "staggering" campaign warchest and "blanketed" the state with positive ads; he focused on constituent services and local issues; and he refused to "pander" to the Tea Party supporters, instead confronting them head-on, arguing that the Republican party needs to be more inclusive.

Candidates

Declared 
 Det Bowers, pastor and businessman
 Lee Bright, state senator
 Richard Cash, businessman and candidate for South Carolina's 3rd congressional district in 2010
 Bill Connor, attorney, lieutenant colonel in the United States Army Reserve and candidate for lieutenant governor in 2010
 Benjamin Dunn, attorney
 Lindsey Graham, incumbent U.S. Senator
 Nancy Mace, businesswoman and author

Withdrew 
 Dave Feliciano, police officer

Declined 
 Bruce Carroll, co-founder of GOProud and blogger at gay conservative site GayPatriot
 Tom Davis, state senator
 Trey Gowdy, U.S. Representative
 Mark Sanford, U.S. Representative and former governor of South Carolina
 Mick Mulvaney, U.S. Representative
 Thomas Ravenel, former South Carolina state treasurer (running as an independent)
 Joe Wilson, U.S. Representative

Endorsements

Debates 
 Complete video of debate, June 7, 2014

Polling 

 ^ Internal poll for Lindsey Graham campaign
 * Internal poll for Lee Bright campaign

 ^ Internal poll for Lindsey Graham campaign

Results

Democratic primary

Candidates

Declared 
 Brad Hutto, state senator
 Jay Stamper, entrepreneur

Declined 
 Jim Hodges, former governor of South Carolina

Endorsements

Polling

Results

Libertarian primary

Candidates

Declared 
 Victor Kocher, nominee for the U.S. Senate in 2002

Independent 
In March 2014, with only controversial businessman and prankster Jay Stamper running for the Democrats, Dick Harpootlian, former chairman of the South Carolina Democratic Party, had stated that business leaders were working on an effort to recruit a potential independent candidate to run in case Graham was defeated in the primary. Such a "contingency" plan was rendered moot by the entry of Democratic state senator Brad Hutto into the race.

Former Republican state treasurer Thomas Ravenel had confirmed that was considering running for the Senate as an Independent and was likely to do so if Lindsey Graham won the Republican primary. In April 2014, with Graham polling strongly in the primary, Ravenel announced he would run. He officially announced his candidacy on July 4.

Candidates

Declared 
 Thomas Ravenel, former Republican state treasurer

General election

Debates 
Graham initially declined to debate his opponents. A spokesman said that his campaign was "in discussions with other groups, as well as looking at the schedule." Hutto said that Graham is "terrified at the thought of defending his own record in a public debate" and Ravenel said Graham's decision was "highly arrogant and disrespectful." Graham claimed he refused to debate because of the presence of third-party candidate Thomas Ravenel, a convicted felon. He ultimately agreed to debate Hutto alone on October 27.
 Complete video of debate, October 27, 2014

Fundraising 
The following are Federal Election Commission disclosures for the pre-primary reporting period.

Predictions

Polling

Results

See also 
 2014 United States Senate special election in South Carolina
 2014 South Carolina gubernatorial election
 2014 United States House of Representatives elections in South Carolina
 2014 United States Senate elections
 2014 United States elections

References

External links 
 U.S. Senate elections in South_Carolina, 2014 at Ballotpedia
 Campaign contributions at OpenSecrets
 South Carolina U.S. Senate debate excerpts, OnTheIssues.org
Official campaign websites
 Det Bowers for U.S. Senate
 Lee Bright for U.S. Senate
 Richard Cash for U.S. Senate
 Bill Connor for U.S. Senate
 Benjamin Dunn for U.S. Senate
 Lindsey Graham for U.S. Senate
 Brad Hutto for U.S. Senate
 Victor Kocher for U.S. Senate
 Nancy Mace for U.S. Senate
 Jay Stamper for U.S. Senate

2014
South Carolina
Senate